USS Dash (AM-428) was an  of the United States Navy. Laid down on 2 July 1951 by the Astoria Marine Construction Co., Astoria, Oregon and launched on 20 September 1952, the ship was commissioned on 14 August 1953, and reclassified as an Ocean Minesweeper, MSO-428, 7 February 1955.

North Atlantic operations 
Sailing from San Diego, California on 12 June 1954 Dash arrived at Charleston, South Carolina on 6 July. She sailed out of Charleston on local duty and for refresher training at Key West, Florida, until 4 January 1956 when she got underway with her division for a tour of duty in the Mediterranean with the U.S. 6th Fleet. She returned to Charleston on 11 June.

Dash served in the Mediterranean again between 1 May and 2 October 1957, and between 27 April and 27 August 1959. Through 1962, she operated along the east coast and in the Caribbean in amphibious and mine warfare exercises.

Decommissioning 
Dash was decommissioned on 2 October 1982, and sold for scrap on 26 January 1984 to Wayne Hobbs of Huntington, California, for $22,229.

References

External links
 

 

Agile-class minesweepers
Ships built in Astoria, Oregon
1952 ships
Cold War minesweepers of the United States